San Bernardo is the name of three villages in Guanajuato, Mexico.

This is one of the small towns of center of Mexico where most of the Bracero pioneers were from. By 1965 the most important income of families in Sanber Gto was from fathers working in California

References

Populated places in Guanajuato